Jefferson Township is one of six townships in Switzerland County, Indiana, United States. As of the 2010 census, its population was 3,167 and it contained 1,493 housing units.

Geography

Cities, towns, villages
 Vevay

Unincorporated towns
 Center Square at 
 Jacksonville at 
 Mount Sterling at 
(This list is based on USGS data and may include former settlements.)

Adjacent townships
 Cotton Township (northeast)
 York Township (east)
 Craig Township (southwest)
 Pleasant Township (northwest)

Major highways
  Indiana State Road 56

Rivers
 Ohio River

School districts
 Switzerland County School Corporation

Political districts
 Indiana's 9th congressional district
 State House District 68
 State Senate District 45

References
 United States Census Bureau 2008 TIGER/Line Shapefiles
 United States Board on Geographic Names (GNIS)
 IndianaMap

External links
 Indiana Township Association
 United Township Association of Indiana

Townships in Switzerland County, Indiana
Townships in Indiana